The Minot Symphony Orchestra (MSO) is a program of Minot State University in Minot, North Dakota. Although a separate agency, the university's music department oversees the handling of the orchestra. Maestro Efrain Amaya, a professor of music at Minot State University, is the orchestra's conductor and has held the position since 2015.

The Minot Symphony Association supports the orchestra. The Minot Area Council of the Arts (MACA), a local non-profit agency that supports the arts, provides advertising, scheduling assistance, and other assistance to the orchestra. Minot is considered to be the smallest city in the United States that supports a full-sized symphony orchestra.

History
The 2009–2010 season is the orchestra's 81st season.

Venue
The MSO's regular performance hall is the Ann Nicole Nelson Hall at Minot State University.

See also
List of symphony orchestras in the United States

Notes

External links
Minot Symphony Orchestra web site
Minot State University web site

Minot, North Dakota
Musical groups from North Dakota
American orchestras
Minot State University
Wikipedia requested audio of orchestras
Tourist attractions in Minot, North Dakota
Musical groups established in 1928
Performing arts in North Dakota
1928 establishments in North Dakota